Torhout is a city and municipality located in the Belgian province of West Flanders. The municipality comprises the city of Torhout proper, the villages of Wijnendale and Sint-Henricus, and the hamlet of De Driekoningen. On January 1, 2012, Torhout had a total population of 20,149. The total area is 45.23 km² which gives a population density of 445 inhabitants per km².

People associated with Torhout
 Rimbert, saint
Josse van Huerter, first settler, and captain-major of the island of Faial in the Portuguese Azores. 
 Karel Van Wijnendaele (Founder of Tour of Flanders (Tour of Flanders))
 Benny Vansteelant (Multiple World Champion Duathlon) and Joerie Vansteelant
 Luk Descheemaeker, winner at the 2nd Holocaust cartoon contest in Tehran, 2016.
Hilde Crevits, Vice Minister-President of the Flemish Government and Flemish minister of Economy, Innovation, Work, Social economy and Agriculture; and former mayor of Torhout (2016-2018)
Brahim Attaeb, R&B singer and presenter

Festivities
Torhout-Werchter was until 1999 one of the largest annual pop festivals in Europe. Efforts were made to have a world music festival in Torhout after Torhout Werchter became Rock Werchter, held in Werchter only.

Sports
The main club of the city is Torhout 1992 KM.

Sights

References

External links

 - Information available in Dutch and limited information available in French, English and German

 
Municipalities of West Flanders